Brittany was the name of a number of steamships.
 , built for the London, Brighton and South Coast Railway
 , built for D MacIver & Co
 , built for the London, Brighton and South Coast Railway
 , built for D MacIver & Co
 , built for the Southern Railway
 , built for the Société Générale des Transports Maritimes à Vapeur

Ship names